Shahrak-e Shahid Daktar Beheshti (also Romanized as Shahrak-e Shahīd Daktar Beheshtī ; also known as Shahrak-e Shahīd Beheshtī and Shahran) is a village in Bala Velayat Rural District, Bala Velayat District, Bakharz County, Razavi Khorasan Province, Iran. At the 2006 census, its population was 1,597, in 345 families.

References 

Populated places in Bakharz County